Colin Grant (born 1961, Hitchin, England) is a British writer of Jamaican origin, who is the author of several books, including a 2008 biography of Marcus Garvey entitled Negro with a Hat: The Rise and Fall of Marcus Garvey and His Dream of Mother Africa and a 2012 memoir, Bageye at the Wheel. Grant is also a historian, Associate Fellow in the Centre for Caribbean Studies and was a BBC radio producer.

Biography

Early years
Grant grew up on a council estate in Luton, had a brother Christopher and attended St Columba's College, St Albans.

Career
Grant joined the BBC in 1991, and has worked as a TV script editor and radio producer of arts and science programmes on Radio 4 and on the World Service. In 2009, a two-part documentary about Caribbean Voices (1943–1958) was produced by Grant. 

He has written and directed plays, including The Clinic, based on the lives of the photojournalists Tim Page and Don McCullin. Among several radio drama-documentaries he has written and produced are African Man of Letters: The Life of Ignatius Sancho, A Fountain of Tears: The Murder of Federico Garcia Lorca, and Move Over Charlie Brown: The Rise of Boondocks.

Grant's first book was the biography Negro with a Hat: The Rise and Fall of Marcus Garvey and His Dream of Mother Africa (2008), described in The Jamaica Gleaner as "magisterial, meticulously researched", in The Independent on Sunday as "drawing on gargantuan research", and in The Guardian as "eminently readable". In 2011, I & I: The Natural Mystics: Marley, Tosh, and Wailer was published, a group biography, about which Lemn Sissay said: "Colin Grant has cleverly personified the birth of a nation, the birth of a religion and the birth of reggae through the lives of Bob Marley, Peter Tosh and Bunny Wailer." This was followed in 2012 by Bageye at the Wheel, a memoir about growing up Jamaican in Luton that was shortlisted for the PEN/Ackerley Prize. 

Grant's next book, a Smell of Burning, was a history of epilepsy and was chosen by The Sunday Times as a Book of the Year 2016. His 2019 book, Homecoming: Voices of the Windrush Generation, was a BBC Radio 4 Book of the Week. In 2023, his memoir I'm Black So You Don't Have To Be was published, its title described by The Guardian as "a jab at the privileges of the children of the Windrush generation who, hell-bent on being accepted by British society, have left the labour of Blackness to their parents."

Having left the BBC in 2018, Grant is now director of WritersMosaic, a division of the Royal Literary Fund.

Personal life
Grant lives in Brighton, UK; he moved there to escape police harassment. He lives there with Jo Alderson and their three children, Jasmine, Maya and Toby.

Bibliography 
Negro with a Hat: The Rise and Fall of Marcus Garvey and His Dream of Mother Africa, London: Jonathan Cape, 2008; Oxford University Press, United States, 2008
I & I: The Natural Mystics: Marley, Tosh, and Wailer, London: Jonathan Cape, 2011; New York: W. W. Norton & Company, 2011
Bageye at the Wheel, London: Jonathan Cape, 2012
A Smell of Burning: The Story of Epilepsy, London: Jonathan Cape, 2017
Homecoming: Voices of the Windrush Generation, London: Jonathan Cape, 2019
I’m Black So You Don’t Have to Be, London: Jonathan Cape, 2023

References

External links
 
 Rob Sharp, "A Page in the Life: Colin Grant", The Telegraph, 11 May 2012.
 Interview with Colin Grant on "New Books in African American Studies".

Jamaican non-fiction writers
Black British writers
Jamaican dramatists and playwrights
Jamaican male writers
British male dramatists and playwrights
1961 births
Living people
English people of Jamaican descent
People from Hitchin
People from Luton
People educated at St Columba's College, St Albans
Male non-fiction writers